Feel'eM is the tenth extended play by South Korean boy group BtoB. It was released on March 6, 2017, by Cube Entertainment under distribution by LOEN Entertainment. The EP features five tracks in total with a variety of genres.

Track listing

Charts

Weekly charts

Monthly charts

Sales

Release history

Music program wins

References

External links 
 "Movie" music video on BtoB's Official Channel
 "Movie" music video on 1theK
 "Movie" music video on United Cube

2017 EPs
BtoB (band) EPs
Cube Entertainment EPs
Korean-language EPs